Sir John Stuart Benger  (born 18 November 1959) is a British civil servant. He has served as Clerk of the House of Commons, the principal constitutional adviser to the House of Commons of the United Kingdom, and adviser on all its procedure and business, since 2019. He is scheduled to take up the role of Master of St Catharine's College, Cambridge, in October 2023.

Early life and education
John Stuart Benger was born on 18 November 1959 in Stockport to Kurt Benger and Marian Benger. He studied at Stockport Grammar School and attended St Catharine's College, Cambridge, where he read English and graduated in 1982 with a Bachelor of Arts degree. Benger later studied at Worcester College, Oxford, where he earned a Postgraduate Certificate in Education in 1983, and a Doctor of Philosophy (DPhil) degree in 1989, with a doctoral thesis on "the authority of writer and text in radical Protestant literature, 1540 to 1593, with particular reference to the Marprelate tracts".

Career
Benger joined the staff of the House of Commons in 1986, working in procedural and committee posts, and became a clerk in 1990. He was appointed the 51st clerk of the House of Commons and succeeded Sir David Natzler on 1 March 2019 upon his retirement.

In February 2023, Sir Lindsay Hoyle, Speaker of the House of Commons, announced Benger's resignation in the autumn to become the 40th master of St Catharine's College, Cambridge, his alma mater. He is scheduled to succeed Sir Mark Welland in the role on 1 October 2023.

Personal life
Benger married Susan Elizabeth Irvine in 1986 and has two sons. He is a supporter of the association football club Manchester United.

Honours
Benger was appointed a Knight Commander of the Order of the Bath (KCB) in the 2023 New Year Honours for services to Parliament.

References

Living people
1959 births
Clerks of the House of Commons
People educated at Stockport Grammar School
Alumni of St Catharine's College, Cambridge
Alumni of Worcester College, Oxford

Knights Commander of the Order of the Bath